Stonewall Jackson School may refer to:

 Stonewall Jackson Youth Development Center or Stonewall Jackson School, Concord, North Carolina
 Stonewall Jackson Middle School, currently Yolanda Black Navarro Middle School, a Houston Independent School District school, Texas
 Stonewall Jackson Middle School, a Hanover County Public School, Mechanicsville, Virginia -now Bell Creek Middle School.
 Stonewall Jackson School (Virginia), Richmond, Virginia

See also
 Stonewall Jackson Elementary School (disambiguation)
 Stonewall Jackson High School (disambiguation)